Emibai Jinnah (1878 - 1893)  was the first cousin and the first wife of the founder of Pakistan, Muhammad Ali Jinnah from 1892 until her death in 1893.

Marriage and death 

Emibai Jinnah was born in 1878 in Paneli Moti, a village in Rajkot district of Gujarat, during the time of British India.

When she was 14 years of age, Muhammad Ali Jinnah's mother Mithibai Jinnah was urging him to marry his cousin Emibai. Jinnah complied with his mother's wishes and married Emibai at Paneli Village. Shortly after the wedding, Jinnah left for England to engage in higher academic studies. During his stay in England both Emibai and his mother died.

Affected by this tragedy, it was 25 years before Jinnah chose to marry again. Aged about 40, he took Rattanbai Petit (1900–1929) as his second wife on April 19, 1918. Rattanbai died on February 20, 1929.

Unlike Rattanbai, a well known figure in her own right, little is known about Emibai.

See also 
 Jinnah family
 Maryam Jinnah

References

External links 

 Muhammad Ali Jinnah Biography President (non-U.S.), Lawyer (1876–1948)
 Life Story of Quaid-e-Azam Muhammad Ali Jinnah
 Quaid-e-Azam and Emibai Jinnah
 Muhammad Ali Jinnah – Pakistan times
 Family photos of Quaid-e-Azam Muhammad Ali Jinnah

1878 births
1893 deaths
Gujarati people
People from Karachi
Indian children